Carol Deene (born Carole Carver; 3 August 1944) is an English pop singer and radio host who achieved success in the early 1960s.

Biography

Early career 
After appearing on Joan Regan's BBC TV programme Be My Guest in 1961, at the age of 16, Deene was signed to the HMV label. She scored her first chart hit in late 1961, and three Top 40 hits on the UK Singles Chart in 1962.

Recordings
Deene's first hit was "Sad Movies (Make Me Cry)", a number 44 entry on the UK chart in October 1961. The song was a cover of a US hit written by John D. Loudermilk and originally performed by pop/country singer Sue Thompson; this was a formula repeated for Deene's second hit, "Norman", which reached number 24 in January 1962.

In a different mould, Deene covered Joanie Somers' US chart hit "Johnny Get Angry" for her third single, and saw it reach number 32 in July that year. Deene's fourth single, "Some People" (the title theme of the film of the same name) hit number 25 in August. Her fifth single reverted to the pattern of her first two, being a cover of a US hit written by John D. Loudermilk and originally performed by Sue Thompson: "James (Hold The Ladder Steady)" reached number 29 and 39 on the NME and Melody Maker charts respectively, although it missed the Record Retailer chart (which has since become the listing used by the Official Charts Company). In 1962, Deene briefly hosted her own show on Radio Luxembourg.

She achieved no further hits after 1962, but despite a serious car accident in 1966, Deene continued to record throughout the 1960s and into 1970, regularly touring the northern clubs. After another car crash in 1974, she recorded only sporadically for a number of labels until the late 1970s. It was later reported that Deene lived in Spain, where she was managing a radio station with her husband.

In January 1997, Diamond Records released a compilation album of Deene's work, entitled Johnny Get Angry. It featured all her recordings for HMV and Columbia.

Single discography

References

1944 births
Living people
People from Thurnscoe
Deene, Carol